Colebrooke, Devon is a village and parish in the county of Devon, England.

Colebrooke may also refer to:

People
 Baron Colebrooke, a title in the Peerage of the United Kingdom
 Henry Thomas Colebrooke (1765–1837), English orientalist and mathematician
 James Colebrooke (banker) (1680–1752), English banker
 Robert Colebrooke (1718–1785), his son, English MP
Robert Hyde Colebrooke (c. 1762–1808), son of Robert, British infantry officer in India
 James Colebrooke (1722–1761), his next son, English MP, 1st Baronet Colebrooke
 George Colebrooke (1729–1809), his last son, English speculator, 2nd Baronet Colebrooke, father of Henry Thomas Colebrooke
 William MacBean George Colebrooke (1787–1870), British soldier and colonial administrator, lieutenant governor of New Brunswick
 Sir Charles James Colebrooke Little (1882–1973), Admiral of the Royal Navy
 James Colebrooke Patterson (1839–1929), Canadian politician

Places
 Colebrooke Island, Andaman Islands
 Colebrooke River, Northern Ireland

See also
 Colebrook (disambiguation)